Cianjin District is an urban district of Kaohsiung City, Taiwan. It is the third smallest district in Kaohsiung City, with a land area of 1.8573 square kilometers, or 0.7171 square miles. It has a population of 26,728, as of January 2023, making it the 12th least populated district of Kaohsiung.

Geography
Cianjin District borders Yancheng District to the west, Sinsing District to the east, Sanmin District to the north, and Lingya District to the south.

Administrative divisions

Cianjin District consists of 20 villages and 263 neighborhoods. The villages in the district are Sanchuan, Caojiang, Zhangcheng, Beijin, Tungjin, Xinsheng, Houjin, Zhangxing, Jingshan, Minsheng, Fuyuan, Lintou, Guomin, Shetung, Shexi, Zhangsheng, Rongfu, Wenxi and Wentung Village.

Institutions
 Taiwan Ocean Research Institute

Tourist attractions
 Central Park
 Kaohsiung Li De Baseball Stadium
 Kaohsiung Museum of Labor
 Kaohsiung Public Library
 Love River
 Urban Spotlight Arcade

Transportation
The district is accessible from City Council Station and Central Park Station of the Kaohsiung MRT.

The district is also served by Provincial Highway 17.

References

External links

 

Districts of Kaohsiung